The politics of Baden-Württemberg takes place within a framework of a federal parliamentary representative democratic republic, where the Federal Government of Germany exercises sovereign rights with certain powers reserved to the states of Germany including Baden-Württemberg. Since 1948 politics in the state has been dominated by the rightist Christian Democratic Union (CDU). However, in the 2011 election the CDU lost its majority in the Landtag of Baden-Württemberg and since various coalitions were formed by the Green leader Winfried Kretschmann.

Minister-presidents since 1952

Since the creation of the state in 1952, the state's Minister-presidents have been:

State parliament since 1952

For election results split by party, see Elections in Baden-Württemberg.

Earlier history

The Minister-Presidents of Baden-Württemberg's predecessor states were:

Prior to the Second World War and the regime of Nazi Germany from 1933, the largest party in both the Republic of Baden and the Free People's State of Württemberg was the Catholic Centre Party.

The leaders of the government of the Republic of Baden:

The leaders of the government of Württemberg 1918 – 1933:

Latest election 

In the 27 March 2011 state assembly election, the ruling CDU/FDP coalition lost its majority of seats. The Alliance '90/The Greens party more than doubled its vote and its number of seats, whereas the Free Democratic Party was reduced to less than half its former result. The Greens and SDP jointly achieved a 4-seat majority over the former coalition partners. On 12 May 2011, after 58 years of CDU dominance, the new assembly elected Winfried Kretschmann as the first Green minister-president.

See also
 Elections in Baden-Württemberg